The mixed doubles competition of the 2021 World Table Tennis Championships was held from 23 to 28 November 2021.

Xu Xin and Liu Shiwen were the defending champions, but neither competed this year.

Wang Chuqin and Sun Yingsha won the title after defeating Tomokazu Harimoto and Hina Hayata 11–2, 11–5, 11–8.

Seeds
Seeding was based on the ITTF world ranking published on 16 November 2021. Ranking for doubles competitions was determined by combining a pair's individual doubles ranking position to form a combined pair ranking.

  Lin Yun-ju /  Cheng I-ching (semifinals)
  Emmanuel Lebesson /  Jia Nan Yuan (quarterfinals)
  Wong Chun Ting /  Doo Hoi Kem (third round)
  Jang Woo-jin /  Jeon Ji-hee (second round)
  Ľubomír Pištej /  Barbora Balážová (second round)
  Ovidiu Ionescu /  Bernadette Szőcs (third round)
  Aleksandr Khanin /  Daria Trigolos (second round)
  Patrick Franziska /  Petrissa Solja (third round)
  Sathiyan Gnanasekaran /  Manika Batra (quarterfinals)
  Dang Qiu /  Nina Mittelham (second round)
  Tomokazu Harimoto /  Hina Hayata (final)
  Omar Assar /  Dina Meshref (second round)
  Ho Kwan Kit /  Lee Ho Ching (quarterfinals)
  Khalid Assar /  Yousra Abdel Razek (first round)
  Wang Chuqin /  Sun Yingsha (champions)
  Álvaro Robles /  María Xiao (quarterfinals)

Draw

Finals

Top half

Section 1

Section 2

Bottom half

Section 3

Section 4

References

External links
Draw

Mixed doubles
Mixed doubles table tennis